Frederick Joseph Stevenson  (December 2, 1895 – January 5, 1928) was a Canadian bush pilot and aviation pioneer. Born in Parry Sound, Ontario, he moved with his family to Winnipeg, Manitoba. In 1916 he joined the Canadian Expeditionary Force, and later serving in the British Royal Flying Corps and Royal Air Force he was awarded a Distinguished Flying Cross  as "A very capable flying officer of exceptional judgement and courage, who has been engaged in a number of combats and personally destroyed three enemy aeroplanes". After the war he became a commercial pilot for Western Canada Airways, most notably supporting mining development by flying 23 tons of cargo to a remote exploration site. Flying the material was less costly than packing it in overland, and helped establish the usefulness of aviation for the development of Canada's North. He was killed in an airplane crash in the town of The Pas, Manitoba. From its opening in 1928 until 1958, the Winnipeg airport was named Stevenson Field. His is commemorated in Winnipeg by Stevenson-Britannia School, Stevenson Road, and Stevenson Campus, Red River College Polytechnic. Elsewhere in Manitoba, Stevenson River and Stevenson Lake are named after him.

See also
History of aviation in Canada
Fokker Universal

References

External links
Frederick Stevenson Icon of his Time, retrieved October 16, 2018

1895 births
1928 deaths
Aviation history of Canada
Bush pilots
Canadian aviators
People from Parry Sound, Ontario
Recipients of the Distinguished Flying Cross (United Kingdom)
Royal Air Force officers